A Lumumba (in Danish also Død tante, German also: Tote Tante [dead aunt]) is a long drink named after Congolese politician Patrice Lumumba. The term Død tante/Tote Tante is used on the western coast of Denmark, northern Germany and the Netherlands, where the drink is the counterpart to the Pharisäer with coffee.

The drink consists of cocoa, sometimes accompanied by cream, and a shot of rum. Some alternatives replace the rum with amaretto or brandy: a popular version in Spain during the years of the Movida madrileña used the local chocolate milk drinks "Cacaolat" or "Okey" with a shot of Spanish brandy, such as Fundador or Soberano.  

Depending on whether the hot or cold cocoa is used, the result is a Hot Lumumba or a Cold Lumumba.

The great unresolved question about the drink is whether its name represents a genuine commemoration or if it derives from "a veiled form of racism".

References 

Cocktails with rum
Chocolate drinks
Two-ingredient cocktails